Online Dating Rituals of the American Male is an American reality television series on Bravo. The series premiered on Sunday, March 9, 2014, prior to moving to its regular time slot on Thursday, March 13, 2014. It follows several men who are looking for everything from a one-night stand to their future wives via the internet.

Episodes

References

External links
 
 

2010s American reality television series
2014 American television series debuts
2014 American television series endings
English-language television shows
Bravo (American TV network) original programming
Television series by Magical Elves